The former All Saints Anglican Church  is an historic Carpenter Gothic style Anglican  church building located at 48 Centennial Drive, Dominion City, in the Rural Municipality of Franklin in Manitoba, Canada. Built in 1879 as an Episcopal Methodist church with a steep pitched roof and lancet windows, it is a modest example of Carpenter Gothic church style. In 1908, it was bought by the Anglican Parish of Dominion City which moved it to its present location and expanded to include the more elaborate details typical of Carpenter Gothic style Anglican churches.

All Saints is a municipal heritage site (No. M0093) as designated by the rural municipality of Franklin on June 8, 1993. The church closed in the 1960s and in 1985 it was bought by the Franklin Crafts Club. Since 1992 it has been the Franklin Museum.

References

External links
 Franklin Museum (Dominion City, RM of Franklin) - Manitoba Historical Society
 Visiting Franklin - Rural Municipality of Franklin

Anglican church buildings in Manitoba
Carpenter Gothic church buildings in Manitoba
Museums in Manitoba

Municipal Heritage Sites in Manitoba
19th-century Anglican church buildings in Canada